Chaibasa railway station is a main railway station in Chaibasa town, Jharkhand. Its code is CBSA. It serves Chaibasa town. The station consists of three platforms. All the platforms are now connected with a well organized railway footover bridge, renovated recently. The platform is not well sheltered. It lacks many facilities including water and sanitation. It is almost 12 km away from the Chaibasa Engineering College

The best connected place is Jamshedpur which is 60 km away from Chaibasa. The second best place is Chakradharpur, 25 km from Chaibasa on Howrah – Mumbai main line.  Chaibasa is a station on the southbound line to Orissa from Rajkharsawn on the Tatanagar–Bilaspur section of Howrah–Nagpur–Mumbai line.

References 

Railway stations in West Singhbhum district
Chakradharpur railway division